The 2016 Donington Park Superbike World Championship round was the seventh round of the 2016 Superbike World Championship. It took place over the weekend of 27–29 May 2016 at the Donington Park.

Championship standings after the round

Superbike Championship standings after Race 1

Superbike Championship standings after Race 2

Supersport Championship standings

External links
 Superbike Race 1 results
 Superbike Race 2 results
 Supersport Race results

2016 Superbike World Championship season
Donington Park Superbike World Championship round
Donington Superbike World Championship round